The Fiat 6640A is an Italian wheeled amphibious armoured vehicle produced from the early 1950s to the 1980s for the Italian government.

6640A
Wheeled amphibious vehicles
1980s cars
Amphibious military vehicles